The Pan-African Patriotic Convergence is a political party in Togo. Former Prime Minister Edem Kodjo is the President of the CPP as of 2007.

The CPP was created in August 1999 through the merger of four parties: the Togolese Union for Democracy (UTD), led by Kodjo, the Party of Action for Democracy (PAD), led by Francis Ekoh, the Party of Democrats for Unity (PDU), and the Union for Democracy and Solidarity (UDS), led by Antoine Foly.

The CPP, as part of the Coalition of Democratic Forces, boycotted the October 2002 parliamentary election. Kodjo ran as the CPP's candidate in the June 2003 presidential election. During the campaign, the CPP called for a debate on television between Kodjo and President Gnassingbé Eyadéma after the RPT engaged in what it considered personal attacks on Kodjo. In the election, Kodjo received 0.96% of the vote and took fifth place. The CPP called for the opposition to unite to choose a single candidate in the April 2005 presidential election, following Eyadéma's death.

Following the 2005 presidential election, Kodjo was appointed as Prime Minister on June 8, 2005. In the government named under Kodjo on June 20, another member of the CPP, Jean-Lucien Savi de Tové, was appointed Minister of Trade and Industry.

The party participated in the October 2007 parliamentary election, but did not win any seats.

Electoral history

Presidential elections

National Assembly elections

See also 
:Category:Pan-African Patriotic Convergence politicians

References

Pan-Africanism in Togo
Political parties in Togo
Pan-Africanist political parties in Africa
Political parties established in 1999
1999 establishments in Togo